Teutamus is a genus of Southeast Asian liocranid sac spiders first described by Tamerlan Thorell in 1890.

Species
 it contains twenty-five species:
Teutamus andrewdavisi Deeleman-Reinhold, 2001 – Borneo
Teutamus apiculatus Dankittipakul, Tavano & Singtripop, 2012 – Malaysia
Teutamus brachiatus Dankittipakul, Tavano & Singtripop, 2012 – Thailand, Malaysia
Teutamus calceolatus Dankittipakul, Tavano & Singtripop, 2012 – Malaysia
Teutamus christae Ono, 2009 – Vietnam
Teutamus deelemanae Dankittipakul, Tavano & Singtripop, 2012 – Malaysia
Teutamus fertilis Deeleman-Reinhold, 2001 – Indonesia (Sumatra)
Teutamus globularis Dankittipakul, Tavano & Singtripop, 2012 – Malaysia
Teutamus hirtellus Dankittipakul, Tavano & Singtripop, 2012 – Philippines
Teutamus jambiensis Deeleman-Reinhold, 2001 – Indonesia (Sumatra)
Teutamus leptothecus Dankittipakul, Tavano & Singtripop, 2012 – Malaysia
Teutamus lioneli Dankittipakul, Tavano & Singtripop, 2012 – Malaysia
Teutamus orthogonus Dankittipakul, Tavano & Singtripop, 2012 – Indonesia (Sumatra)
Teutamus poggii Dankittipakul, Tavano & Singtripop, 2012 – Indonesia (Sumatra)
Teutamus politus Thorell, 1890 (type) – Thailand, Malaysia
Teutamus rama Dankittipakul, Tavano & Singtripop, 2012 – Thailand, Malaysia
Teutamus rhino Deeleman-Reinhold, 2001 – Indonesia (Java)
Teutamus rollardae Dankittipakul, Tavano & Singtripop, 2012 – Indonesia (Sumatra)
Teutamus rothorum Deeleman-Reinhold, 2001 – Indonesia (Java)
Teutamus seculatus Dankittipakul, Tavano & Singtripop, 2012 – Malaysia, Indonesia
Teutamus serrulatus Dankittipakul, Tavano & Singtripop, 2012 – Malaysia
Teutamus spiralis Dankittipakul, Tavano & Singtripop, 2012 – Borneo
Teutamus sumatranus Dankittipakul, Tavano & Singtripop, 2012 – Indonesia (Sumatra)
Teutamus tortuosus Dankittipakul, Tavano & Singtripop, 2012 – Indonesia (Sumatra)
Teutamus vittatus Deeleman-Reinhold, 2001 – Borneo

References

External links

Araneomorphae genera
Liocranidae
Taxa named by Tamerlan Thorell